, also referred to as the , was the fourth complete Icelandic translation of the Bible printed in 1747 by the Kongelige Vajsenhus's print shop in Copenhagen, Denmark.  is the Icelandic version of . In 1727, the Vajsenhus was granted exclusive rights by Frederick IV of Denmark to publish the Bible in Denmark–Norway.

, who became bishop of Hólar in 1746, had begun translating the New Testament from Danish and planned to publish it, but Bishop Ludvig Harboe suggested it would be better for the entire Bible to be published in Icelandic.

The New Testament was released in August 1746 as an inexpensive duodecimo edition, which at a half Danish rigsdaler would be affordable to the poor. At the same time a larger quarto edition of the New Testament was prepared. In October 1747, the Old Testament was completed in the same format. The full Bible numbered 1,742 pages and 1,000 copies were produced. The cost of the finished book was 1 rigsdaler unbound or 2 rigsdaler bound, thanks to a subsidy from the churches of Iceland.

References

18th century in Iceland
History of Christianity in Iceland
1764 books
Bible